The 2003–04 Croatian Football Cup was the 13th edition of Croatia's premier association football knockout competition. Hajduk Split were the defending champions, and the cup was eventually won by Dinamo Zagreb on away goals rule after the aggregate score in the final tie was 1–1 against Varteks. This was the 7th Croatian cup title for Dinamo and Varteks' fourth final without a win.

Calendar

Preliminary round

First round

Second round

Quarter-finals

|}

Semi-finals

First legs

Second legs

Varteks won 8–2 on aggregate.

Dinamo Zagreb won 4–3 on aggregate.

Final

First leg

Second leg

Dinamo Zagreb won on away goals rule.

See also
2003–04 Croatian First Football League
2003–04 Croatian Second Football League

External links
Official website 
2003–04 in Croatian football at Rec.Sport.Soccer Statistics Foundation

Croatian Football Cup seasons
Croatian Cup, 2003-04
Croatian Cup, 2003-04